Mukamlar (singular: mukam) is a term for bodies of musical repertoire for the Turkmen dutar (two-stringed lute) or tüÿdük (an end-blown flute). Mukumlar represents the most important repertoires in the Turkmen classical tradition after the baksy songs. There are several mukamlar for each instrument;  instrumentalists may disagree on the number.   There are, however, five dutar pieces acknowledged to form the  repertoire:  Goñurbaş mukamy, Gökdepe mukamy, Erkeklik mukamy, Aÿralyk mukamy and Mukamlarbaşy.  The latter two may be compared to that of a level for virtuosos.

Despite their similar namings, the similarity when comparing Turkmen mukam and the Arabic classical tradition of maqam, together with Uzbek shashmakom and Azerbaijani mugam, is quite small. There are no intrinsic musical similarities. However, there are certain links, in terms of modality and technique, between the Turkmen and Kazak dutar and dombra repertoire.

Turkmen music